Abd Allāh ibn ‘Abd ar-Raḥman Sirāj (1876 – May 1949) was an Arab politician and Islamic scholar who held various posts in the Kingdom of Hejaz and later the Emirate of Transjordan, including the office of Prime Minister of both countries (including being the 5th Prime Minister of Jordan). Born in Mecca, he graduated from Madrasah as-Sawlatiyah and later al-Azhar University in Cairo. In 1907 he was appointed Mufti of the Hanafis in Mecca by Sharif Ali Abd Allah. He was elected to represent Mecca in the Ottoman parliament in 1908, though he resigned before he ever served. After Sharif Husayn declared independence from the Ottoman Empire in 1916, he appointed Siraj as Chief Justice and Deputy Prime Minister of the Hejaz government. Siraj served as acting Prime Minister in lieu of Emir Ali until 1918. After Husayn abdicated the throne in 1924, Siraj held the office of Prime Minister during most of Ali's short reign, which ended with the Kingdom's surrender to the Saudi Sultanate of Nejd in 1925. He then migrated to the Jordan, where under Emir Abd Allah he served as Prime Minister from 1931 to 1933 while simultaneously holding the portfolios of Finance and the Interior Ministry, as well as the office of Chief Justice.

References

1870s births
1949 deaths
Hanafis
People from Mecca
Prime Ministers of Jordan
Interior ministers of Jordan
Finance ministers of Jordan
Jordanian judges
Muftis of Mecca